Michael Enright (born 1952) was a Democratic Left politician from County Wexford in Ireland. He was a member of Wexford Corporation and served briefly as a senator in 1997.

Born in Ennis, County Clare, Enright was a teacher at Kilmuckridge Vocational School in County Wexford. An officer of Wexford Council of Trade Unions, he joined the Labour Party in 1973, and in the 1979 local elections he stood as a candidate for the Socialist Labour Party. He joined the Workers' Party in 1982 and was elected to Wexford Corporation in 1985; he remained a councillor until his death 12 years later. At the 1987 and  1989 general elections, he stood unsuccessfully as a Workers' Party candidate in the Wexford constituency, and also failed to win a seat in the European Parliament when he stood in the Leinster constituency at the 1989 European election.

When the Workers' Party split in 1992, he joined the breakaway Democratic Left, later becoming a member of the party's executive committee. He contested the 1992 and 1997 general elections as Democratic Left candidate, but again failed to win a seat. He became a member of Teastas, the Irish National Certification Authority, when it was set up in 1995.

References

1952 births
1997 deaths
Workers' Party (Ireland) politicians
Democratic Left (Ireland) senators
Members of the 20th Seanad
People from Ennis
Local councillors in County Wexford
Politicians from County Clare
Nominated members of Seanad Éireann